Henry Harding may refer to:
Henry Harding (actor), Ghanaian film actor
Henry Harding (chess player) in American Chess Congress
Henry Harding, character in Preaching to the Perverted (film)

See also
Henry Hardinge, politician

Harry Harding (disambiguation)